The 1925–26 North Carolina Tar Heels men's basketball team represented the University of North Carolina during the 1925–26 NCAA men's basketball season in the United States. The team finished the season with a 20–5 record and won the 1926 Southern Conference men's basketball tournament. Jack Cobb was Helms Foundation College Basketball Player of the Year.

References

External links 

 

North Carolina Tar Heels men's basketball seasons
North Carolina
North Carolina Tar Heels Men's Basketball Team
North Carolina Tar Heels Men's Basketball Team